William Duncan McLeod (April 4, 1852 – August 14, 1908) was a cheese maker, farmer and politician in Ontario. He represented Glengarry from 1902 to 1904 in the Legislative Assembly of Ontario as a Conservative.

The son of Kenneth McLeod and Ann Duncan, he was born in Kirk Hill, Glengarry County. In 1875, he married Jane McDougall. McLeod dealt in cheese and owned several factories. He was defeated by John Angus McMillan when he ran for reelection in 1904. He died four years later.

References

External links

1852 births
1908 deaths
Cheesemakers
Progressive Conservative Party of Ontario MPPs